Colonel Václav Robert Bozděch (15 July 1912 in Soběkury– 27 February 1980 in Devon) was a Czech air gunner of World War II. He was a British Royal Air Force (RAF) squadron gunner and commander of training centers.

Early life
Bozděch was trained as a locksmith. Before the war he became a soldier and a trained air gunner.

World War II
He arrived to Great Britain through Poland and then France, where he served in the French Air Force a short time. In the UK, he served first as an air gunner with No. 311 Squadron RAF. After having flown his first tour he became an instructor and commander of the training centres.

Bozdech was accompanied through the war by a German Shepherd dog, which he found as a puppy after a crash landing while in the French Air Force, who he and his fellow Czech airmen named Antis, after a well-known Soviet aeroplane ANT-40. Their story was later told in at least 3 books. (see Dogs in warfare)

After World War II
After the war he returned to Czechoslovakia and worked at the Ministry of Defence. He married and had a son. He also wrote and published books – Gentlemen of Dusk and Duel with Destiny. After the 1948 Czechoslovak coup d'état he went into exile a second time and returned to the UK, where he rejoined the RAF and married again. He never returned to his homeland. In the context of rehabilitation, after 1989 he was posthumously promoted to the rank of colonel.

References and further reading

1912 births
1980 deaths
People from Plzeň-South District
Non-British Royal Air Force personnel of World War II
Czechoslovak emigrants to the United Kingdom